A list of films produced by the Marathi language film industry based in Maharashtra in the year 1940.

1940 Releases
A list of Marathi films released in 1940.

References

External links
Gomolo - 

Lists of 1940 films by country or language
1940
1940 in Indian cinema